Las Palmitas may refer to:

Las Palmitas, Argentina
Las Palmitas, Los Santos, Panama
 A neighbourhood in the city of Pachuca, Mexico

See also
 Palmitas, Soriano Department, Uruguay